Claude Pierson (17 November 1930 – 19 March 1997) (also known as Caroline Joyce, Carolyne Joyce, Carolyn Joyce, Andrée Marchand, André Marchand and Paul Martin) was a French film director, writer and producer.

His most famous film is Justine de Sade (1972), with Alice Arno in the lead role, the most faithful adaptation of the famous work of the Marquis de Sade.

References

External links 
 

1930 births
1997 deaths
French film directors
French film producers
20th-century French screenwriters
Writers from Paris
French pornographic film directors